Summer Make Good is the third studio album by Icelandic band Múm. It was released on 12 April 2004 by FatCat Records.

The CD edition of Summer Make Good was released in a cardboard sleeve. 28 June 2004 saw the release of a "limited presentation" edition of the album: a hardcover book (with dust jacket) containing artwork, and with the CD slotted into the inside back cover.

Track listing
All tracks are written by Örvar Þóreyjarson Smárason, Gunnar Örn Tynes and Kristín Anna Valtýsdóttir, except where noted.

Personnel
Credits are adapted from the album's liner notes.

Additional musicians
 Ólöf Arnalds – guitar, viola, Stroh violin, xylophone, backing vocals
 Girls from Austurbæjarskóli (Ársól Þóra Sigurðardóttir, Brynja Siggeirsdóttir, Halla Björg Sigurþórsdóttir, Perla Hafþórsdóttir, Vigdís Perla Maack and Viktoria Sigurðardóttir) – vocals on "Weeping Rock, Rock"
 Samuli Kosminen – drums, percussion, sampler
 Eiríkur Orri Ólafsson – trumpet, pianette, Moog synthesizer, whistle
 Adam Pierce – harp
 Halldór Arnar Úlfarsson – halldorophone

Production
 Graeme Durham – editing
 Orri Jónsson – mixing, recording
 Múm – mixing
 Mandy Parnell – mastering

Design
 Dave Howell – artwork
 Dave Thomas – artwork

Charts

References

External links
 
 

2004 albums
Múm albums
FatCat Records albums